The Mount Simon Sandstone is the basal sandstone of the Potsdam Sandstone. It was deposited in a nearshore environment, unconformably overlying Precambrian basement.

It is overlain by the Eau Claire Formation or Ordovician strata. It is presumed to be Upper Cambrian in age, though not verified. See infobox for more details.

The Mount Simon formation is the equivalent of the La Motte Sandstone formation in the St. Francois Mountains of Missouri.

References

Cambrian United States
Sandstone formations of the United States
Cambrian Kentucky
Cambrian Illinois
Cambrian Indiana
Cambrian Michigan
Cambrian Ohio
Cambrian geology of Wisconsin
Cambrian System of North America
Cambrian southern paleotemperate deposits